A law school in the United States is an educational institution where students obtain a professional education in law after first obtaining an undergraduate degree.

Law schools in the U.S. confer the degree of Juris Doctor (J.D.), which is a professional doctorate. It is the degree usually required to practice law in the United States, and the final degree obtained by most practitioners in the field. Juris Doctor programs at law schools are usually three-year programs if done full-time, or four-year programs if done via evening classes. Some U.S. law schools include an Accelerated JD program.

Other degrees that are awarded include the Master of Laws (LL.M.) and the Doctor of Juridical Science (J.S.D. or S.J.D.) degrees, which can be more international in scope. Most law schools are colleges, schools or other units within a larger post-secondary institution, such as a university. Legal education is very different in the United States than in many other parts of the world.

Terminology
A 2006 study found that the names of the 192 law schools approved by the American Bar Association (ABA) at that time included one of five generic identifiers: "school of law" (118), "college of law" (38), "law school" (28), "law center" (7), and "faculty of law" (1).  However, in ordinary speech, "law school" is universally preferred for its "brevity and clarity."

Admission
In the United States, law schools require a bachelor's degree in any discipline, a satisfactory undergraduate grade point average (GPA), and a satisfactory score on the Law School Admission Test (LSAT) as prerequisites for admission. Some states that have non-ABA-approved schools or state-accredited schools have equivalency requirements that usually equal 90 credits toward a bachelor's degree. Additional personal factors are evaluated through essays, short-answer questions, letters of recommendation, and other application materials. The standards for grades and LSAT scores vary from school to school.

Though undergraduate GPA and LSAT score are the most important factors considered by law school admissions committees, individual factors are also somewhat important. Interviews—either in person or via video chat—are sometimes used as optional or by-invite application components. Many law schools actively seek applicants from outside the traditional pool to boost racial, economic, and experiential diversity on campus. Most law schools now factor in extracurricular activities, work experience, and unique courses of study in their evaluation of applicants. A growing number of law school applicants have several years of work experience, and correspondingly fewer law students enter immediately after completing their undergraduate education. However, law schools generally only consider undergraduate and not post-collegiate transcripts when considering an applicant for admission;  the former are considered by law schools to be a more uniform standard than the latter for judging academic performance.

Many law schools offer substantial scholarships and grants to many of their students, dramatically reducing the actual cost of attending law school compared to sticker tuition. Some law schools condition scholarships on maintaining a certain GPA.

 there were 128,641 students enrolled in JD programs at the 204 approved ABA law schools.

Accreditation
To sit for the bar exam, the vast majority of state bar associations require accreditation of an applicant's law school by the American Bar Association. The ABA has promulgated detailed requirements covering every aspect of a law school, down to the precise contents of the law library and the minimum number of minutes of instruction required to receive a law degree. , there are 203 ABA-accredited law schools that award the J.D., divided between 202 with full accreditation and one with provisional accreditation. The Judge Advocate General's Legal Center and School in Charlottesville, Virginia, a school operated by the United States Army that conducts a post-J.D. program for military attorneys, is also ABA-accredited.

Non-ABA approved law schools have much lower bar passage rates than ABA-approved law schools, and do not submit or disclose employment outcome data to the ABA.

In addition, individual state legislatures or bar examiners may maintain a separate approval system, which is open to non-ABA accredited schools. If that is the case, graduates of these schools may generally sit for the bar exam only in the state in which their school is accredited. California is the most famous example of state-specific approval. The State Bar of California's Committee of Bar Examiners approves many schools that may not qualify for or request ABA accreditation. Graduates of such schools can sit for the bar exam in California, and once they have passed that exam, a large number of states allow those students to sit for their bars (after practicing for a certain number of years in California).

California is also the first state to allow graduates of distance legal education (online and correspondence) to take its bar exam. However, online and correspondence law schools are generally not accredited by the ABA or approved by state bar examiners, and the eligibility of their graduates to sit for the bar exam may vary from state to state. Even in California, for instance, the State Bar deems certain online schools as "registered," meaning their graduates may take the bar exam, but also specifically says the "Committee of Bar Examiners does not approve nor accredit correspondence schools." Kentucky goes further by specifically disqualifying correspondence school graduates from admission to the bar. This applies even if the graduate has gained admission in another jurisdiction.

Curriculum

Law students are referred to as 1Ls, 2Ls, and 3Ls based on their year of study. In the United States, the American Bar Association does not mandate a particular curriculum for 1Ls. ABA Standard 302(a)(1) requires only the study of "substantive law" that will lead to "effective and responsible participation in the legal profession." However, most law schools have their own mandatory curriculum for 1Ls, which typically includes:

 Civil procedure (Federal Rules of Civil Procedure)
 Constitutional law (United States Constitution, especially Fifth and Fourteenth Amendments, and the Commerce Clause)
 Contracts (Article 2 (Sales) of the Uniform Commercial Code and Restatement (Second) of Contracts)
 Criminal law (General common law, Model Penal Code, and state criminal statutes)
 Property (General common law and Restatement of Property)
 Torts (General common law, Restatement (Second) and Restatement (Third) of Torts)
 Legal research (Use of a law library, LexisNexis, and Westlaw)
 Legal writing (including objective analysis, persuasive analysis, and legal citation)

These basic courses are intended to provide an overview of the broad study of law. Not all ABA-approved law schools offer all of these courses in the 1L year; for example, many schools do not offer constitutional law and/or criminal law until the second and third years. Most schools also require Evidence but rarely offer the course to first-year students. Some schools combine legal research and legal writing into a single year-long "lawyering skills" course, which may also include a small oral argument component.

Because the first year curriculum is always fixed, most schools do not allow 1L students to select their own course schedules, and instead hand them their schedules at new student orientation.

At most schools, the grade for an entire course depends upon the outcome of only one or two examinations, usually in essay form, which are administered via students' laptop computers in the classroom with the assistance of specialized software. Some professors may use multiple choice exams in part or in full if the course material is suitable for it (e.g., professional responsibility). Legal research and writing courses tend to have several major projects (some graded, some not) and a final exam in essay form. Most schools impose a mandatory grade curve (see below).

After the first year, law students are generally free to pursue different fields of legal study.  All law schools offer (or try to offer) a broad array of upper-division courses in areas of substantive law like administrative law, corporate law, international law, admiralty law, intellectual property law, and tax law, and in areas of procedural law not normally covered in the first year, like criminal procedure and remedies.  Many law schools also offer upper-division practical training courses in client counseling, trial advocacy, appellate advocacy, and alternative dispute resolution. Depending upon the law school, practical training courses may involve fictional exercises in which students interact with each other or with volunteer actors playing clients, witnesses, and judges, or real-world cases at legal clinics.

Graduation is the assured outcome for the majority of students who pay their tuition on time, behave honorably and responsibly, maintain a minimum per-semester unit count and grade point average, take required upper-division courses, and successfully complete a certain number of units by the end of their sixth semester.

The ABA also requires that all students at ABA-approved schools take an ethics course in professional responsibility. Typically, this is an upper-level course; most students take it in the 2L year. This requirement was added after the Watergate scandal, which seriously damaged the public image of the profession because President Richard Nixon and most of his alleged co-conspirators were lawyers. The ABA desired to demonstrate that the legal profession could regulate itself, wished to reassert and maintain its position of leadership, and hoped to prevent direct federal regulation of the profession.

As of 2004, to ensure that students' research and writing skills do not deteriorate, the ABA has added an upper division writing requirement. Law students must take at least one course, or complete an independent study project, as a 2L or 3L that requires the writing of a paper for credit.

Most law courses are less about doctrine and more about learning how to analyze legal problems, read cases, distill facts and apply law to facts.

In 1968, the Ford Foundation began disbursing $12 million to persuade law schools to make "law school clinics" part of their curriculum. Clinics were intended to give practical experience in law practice while providing pro bono representation to the poor. However, conservative critics charge that the clinics have been used instead as an avenue for the professors to engage in left-wing political activism. Critics cite the financial involvement of the Ford Foundation as the turning point when such clinics began to change from giving practical experience to engaging in advocacy.

Law schools that offer accelerated JD programs have unique curricula for such programs. Nonetheless, ABA-approved law schools with Accelerated JD programs must meet ABA rules.

Finally, the emphasis in law schools is rarely on the law of the particular state in which the law school sits, but on the law generally throughout the country. Although this makes studying for the bar exam more difficult since one must learn state-specific law, the emphasis on legal skills over legal knowledge can benefit law students not intending to practice in the same state they attend law school.

Grades, grading, and GPA curves

Grades in law school are very competitive. Most schools grade on a curve. In most law schools, the first year curve (1L) is considerably lower than courses taken after the first year of law school.

Many schools use a "median" grading system, that can range from "B-plus medians" to "C-minus medians". Some professors are obliged to determine which exam or paper was the exact median in terms of quality (e.g., the 26th best out of 51), give that paper the relevant grade depending on the system used, and then grade the other exams based on how much better or worse they are than the median. A few schools, such as Yale Law School, Stanford Law School, Harvard Law School, University of California, Berkeley School of Law, and Northeastern University School of Law have alternate grading systems that put less emphasis (or no emphasis) on rank. Other schools, such as New York's Fordham Law School, use a forced grading distribution, where a predetermined percentage of students must receive certain grades. For instance, such a system could oblige professors to award a minimum and maximum number of "A's" and "F's" (e.g., 3.5%/7% A's and 4.5%/10% F's). Many professors chafe against the lack of discretion provided by such systems, especially the required failing of a certain number of students whose performance may have been sub-par but not, in the professor's estimation, worthy of a failing grade. The "median" system seeks to provide some parity among teachers' grading scales while giving the teacher discretion to award a grade below the median only when deserved.

Fairness and equity are the primary reasons for required curves and required grade distributions.  Some faculty tend to give higher grades and others lower grades, with a mandatory curve balancing both extremes.  Also, at law schools with multiple sections of the same class, it minimizes the problem that one section will have an unfair advantage over another section when applying for Law Review or Moot Court.

Even with curved grading, some law schools such as Syracuse University College of Law still have a policy of "Dismissal for Academic Deficiency", in which students failing to meet a minimum GPA are dismissed from the school.

One school that has deviated from the system of competitive grading common to most American law schools is Northeastern University School of Law. Northeastern does not have any system of grade point averages or class rank, Instead, the school uses a system of narrative evaluations to measure student performance.

A system of anonymous grading known as blind grading is used in many law schools in the United States. It is intended to counter bias by the grader. Each semester students are assigned random numbers, usually by the Registrar's Office, which students must include on their exams.  Professors then grade the exams on an anonymous basis, only discovering student names after grades have been submitted to the Registrar's Office. General adoption of blind grading followed admission of significant numbers of minority students to law schools.

Accelerated JD programs

An Accelerated JD program may refer to one of the following:
 A program that combines a bachelor's degree with a juris doctor degree ("3+3 JD program" or "BA to JD program").
 A two-year juris doctor degree that is offered in a condensed period, separately from a bachelor's degree ("2-year JD program").

As a result of student concerns about the time and cost (both in terms of tuition and the opportunity cost associated with foregoing a salary for three years) required to complete a law degree, there has been an emerging trend to develop accelerated JD programs.

Pedagogical methods

Most law school education in the United States is based on standards developed by Christopher Columbus Langdell and James Barr Ames at Harvard Law School during the 1870s. Professors generally lead in-class debates over the issues in selected court cases, compiled into "casebooks" for each course. Traditionally, law professors chose not to lecture extensively, and instead used the Socratic method to force students to teach each other based on their individual understanding of legal theory and the facts of the case at hand.

Many law schools continue to use the Socratic method—consisting of calling on a student at random, asking about an argument made in an assigned case, asking the student whether they agrees with the argument, and then using a series of questions designed to expose logical flaws in the student's argument. Examinations usually entail interpreting the facts of a hypothetical case, determining how legal theories apply to the case, and then writing an essay. This process is intended to train students in the reasoning methods necessary to interpret theories, statutes, and precedents correctly, and argue their validity, both orally and in writing. In contrast, most civil law countries base their legal education on professorial lectures and oral examinations, which are more suited for the mastery of complicated civil codes.

This style of teaching is often disorienting to first-year law students who are more accustomed to taking notes from professors' lectures. Most casebooks do not clearly outline the law; instead, they force the student to interpret the cases and derive the basic legal concepts from the cases themselves. As a result, many publishers market law school outlines that concisely summarize the basic concepts of each area of law, and good outlines are highly sought after by many students, although some professors discourage their use.

Legal pedagogy has also been criticized by scholars like Alan Watson in his book, The Shame of Legal Education. Some law schools, such as Savannah Law School, have changed direction and created collaborative learning environments to allow students to work directly with each other and professors in order to model the teamwork of attorneys working on a case.

For purposes of passing state bar examinations, some law school graduates find law school instruction inadequate, and resort to specialized bar review courses from private course providers. These bar reviews typically consist of lectures, often video recorded.

History
Until the late 19th century, law schools were uncommon in the United States. Most people entered the legal profession through reading law, a form of independent study or apprenticeship, often under the supervision of an experienced attorney. This practice usually consisted of reading classic legal texts, such as Edward Coke's Institutes of the Lawes of England and William Blackstone's Commentaries on the Laws of England.

In colonial America law schools did not exist. Within a few years following the American Revolution, some universities such as the College of William and Mary and the University of Pennsylvania established a "Chair in Law". Columbia College appointed its first Professor of Law, James Kent, in 1793. Those who held these positions were the sole purveyors of legal education (per se) for their institutions—though law was, of course, discussed in other academic areas as a matter of course—and gave lectures designed to supplement, rather than replace, an apprenticeship.

The first institution established for the sole purpose of teaching law was the Litchfield Law School, set up by Judge Tapping Reeve in 1784 to organize the large number of would-be apprentices or lecture attendees that he attracted. Despite the success of that institution, and of similar programs set up thereafter at Harvard University (1817), Dickinson College (1834), Yale University (1843), Albany Law School (1851), and Columbia University (1858), law school attendance would remain a rare exception in the profession. Apprenticeship would be the norm until the 1890s, when the American Bar Association (which had been formed in 1878) began pressing states to limit admission to the bar to those who had satisfactorily completed several years of post-graduate instruction. In 1906, the Association of American Law Schools adopted a requirement that law school consist of a three-year course of study.

Women

Women were not allowed in most law schools during the late 1800s and the early 1900s. In 1869, Washington University School of Law became the first chartered law school in America to admit women. The "first woman on record to have received a law degree was Ada Kepley from Union College of Law in Illinois (Northwestern)" in 1870. Some law schools that allowed women before most others were Buffalo Law School which "begun in 1887 . . . and open to women and immigrant groups"; University of Iowa which "admitted women as law students" since at least 1869; University of Michigan; and Boston University Law School which started admitting women in 1872. "In 1878 two women successfully sued to be admitted to the first class at Hastings Law School [University of California]," one of whom was Clara S. Foltz.  When the University of California established a second law program in 1894, this time on the Berkeley campus, it was open to women and men on an equal basis. Ellen Spencer Mussey and Emma Gillett founded the Washington Law School for women and men in 1898 (now known as, American University Washington College of Law).

The difficulty for women law students was further aggravated by the fact that courts did not allow women to be admitted as lawyers, as demonstrated in the famous case involving Myra Bradwell as the plaintiff in Bradwell v. Illinois (1870). The federal courts were subsequently opened to women in 1878 due to a successful campaign by Belva Ann Lockwood.

The elite law schools remained closed to women for a while after. Pushed by the suffragist movement for women, Harvard Law School started considering admitting women in 1899 but without success. Partly in response to the pressures of the suffragist movement and the unwillingness of elite law schools to open their doors, "in 1908, Portia Law School was founded in Boston" which later became the New England School of Law and was the only law school at the time with "an all women student body". In 1915, due to Harvard's continued refusal to admit women, the Cambridge Law School for Women was established as an alternative to elite law schools, and was to be "as nearly as possible a replica of the Harvard Law School as is possible to make it." World War I encouraged the movement toward admitting women to law schools, and in 1918, Fordham Law School and Yale Law School started admitting women. Northeastern University School of Law, at the time a YMCA institution, started admitting women in 1923. Harvard Law School did not admit women until 1950. In 1966, Notre Dame Law School started admitting women.

Despite all of these advances, "[i]n 1963, women had comprised only 2.7 percent of the profession. In the academic year 1969–70, only 6.35 percent of the degree candidates at law school were women." A prevalent attitude has been mentioned several times by Hillary Clinton, who recalled that she had been accepted at Harvard Law School in 1969 but had been repelled by a professor who told her at a student-recruitment party, "we don't need any more women at Harvard." (She went to Yale Law School instead.) Attendance of women at law schools did however improve significantly in the next 10-year period. "In 1968, 3,704 of the 62,000 law students in approved schools were women; by 1979, there were 37,534 women out of 117,279 students in approved schools" although still represented in larger proportions in less elite law schools. In 2016, the number of women enrolled in ABA-approved law schools reached the majority (50.09%), with female students being 55,766 of the total 111,327.

Credentials obtainable while in law school
Within each U.S. law school, key credentials include:
 Law review/Law journal membership or editorial position (based either on grades or write-on competition or both). This is important for at least three reasons. First, because it is determined by either grades or writing ability, membership is an indicator of strong academic performance. This leads to the second reason, which is that potential employers sometimes use law review membership in their hiring criteria. Third, work on law review exposes a student to legal scholarship and editing, and often allows the student to publish a significant piece of legal scholarship on his or her own. Most law schools have a "flagship" journal usually called "School name Law Review" (for example, the Harvard Law Review—although some schools call their flagship journal "School name Law Journal"; see Yale Law Journal) that publishes articles on all areas of law, and one or more other specialty law journals that publish articles concerning only a particular area of the law (for example, the Harvard Journal of Law & Technology).
 Moot court membership or award (based on oral and written argument). Success in moot court can distinguish one as an outstanding oral advocate and provides a degree of practical legal training that is often absent from law review membership. Moot court and related activities, such as Trial Advocacy and Dispute Resolution, may appeal especially to employers hiring for litigation positions, such as a district attorney's office.
 Mock trial membership and awards (based on trial level advocacy skills) also can distinguish one as an outstanding trial advocate and help develop "real world" skills that are often valuable to employers hiring for litigation positions.
 Order of the Coif membership (based on grade point average). This is often coupled with Latin honors (summa and magna cum laude, though often not cum laude). However, a slight majority of law schools in the U.S. do not have Order of the Coif chapters.

State and federal court clerkship

On the basis of a student's credentials, as well as favorable faculty recommendations, some students obtain a one or two-year clerkship with a judge after graduation. It is becoming more common for clerkships to begin after a few years in private practice. Clerkships may be with state or federal judges.

Clerkships are meant to provide the recent law school graduate with experience working for a judge. Often, clerks engage in significant legal research and writing for the judge, writing memos to assist a judge in coming to a legal conclusion in some cases, and writing drafts of opinions based on the judge's decisions. Appellate court clerkships, although generally more prestigious, do not necessarily give one a great deal of practical experience in the day-to-day life of a lawyer in private practice. The average litigator might get much more out of a clerkship at the trial court level, where they will be learning about motions practices, dealing with lawyers, and generally learning how a trial court works on the inside.

By and large, though, clerkships provide other valuable assets to a young lawyer. Judges often become mentors to young clerks, providing the young attorney with an experienced individual to go for advice. Fellow clerks can also become lifelong friends and/or professional connections. Clerkships are great experiences for the new lawyers, and law schools encourage graduates to engage in a clerkship to broaden their professional experiences. However, there simply are not enough clerkships to accommodate all the academically eligible graduates.

United States Supreme Court clerkship
Some law school graduates are able to clerk for one of the Justices on the Supreme Court (each Justice takes two to four clerks per year). Often, these clerks are graduates of elite law schools, with Harvard, Yale, the University of Chicago, the University of Michigan, Columbia, the University of Virginia, and Stanford being among the most highly represented schools. Justice Clarence Thomas is the major exception to the rule that Justices hire clerks from elite schools; he takes pride in selecting clerks from non-top-tier schools, and publicly noted that his clerks have been attacked on the Internet as "third tier trash."

Most Supreme Court clerks have clerked in a lower court, often for a year with a highly selective federal circuit court judge (such as Judges Alex Kozinski, Michael Luttig, J. Harvie Wilkinson, David Tatel, Richard Posner) known as a "feeder judge". It is perhaps the most highly selective and prestigious position a recently graduated lawyer can have, and Supreme Court clerks are often highly sought after by law firms, the government, and law schools. Law firms give Supreme Court clerks as much as a $400,000 bonus for signing with their firm. The vast majority of Supreme Court clerks either become academics at elite law schools, enter private practice as appellate attorneys, or take highly selective government positions.

Controversies involving U.S. law schools

Employment statistics and salary information

After the JD, a large study of law graduates who passed the bar examination, found that even graduates of lower ranked law schools were typically making six figure ($100,000+) incomes within 12 years after graduation. Graduates of higher ranking schools typically earned more than $170,000.  The Economic Value of a Law Degree, a peer reviewed study which included law graduates who did not pass the bar exam and were not practicing law, found that law graduates at the 25th percentile of earnings ability typically earned around $20,000 more every year than they would have earned with only a bachelor's degree.  Graduates at the 75th percentile earned around $80,000 more per year than they likely would have earned with a bachelor's degree.  However, only around 60 to 70 percent of law graduates practice law. Some authors have criticized employment information supplied directly by law schools; however, these studies report information supplied directly by law graduates, and in the case of the latter study, collected by the United States Census Bureau as part of a broader economic survey.

New York Times negative press coverage
Starting in 2011, American law schools became the subject of a series of critical articles in mainstream news publications, starting with a series of New York Times articles by David Segal. Such articles have reported on the debt loads of law graduates, the difficulty of securing employment in the legal profession, and insufficient practical training at American law schools. A number of critics have pointed out factual inaccuracies and logical errors in New York Times' higher education coverage, especially related to law schools.

More recent press coverage by some higher education reporters has noted that peer reviewed studies and comprehensive data suggests that law graduates are still typically better off financially than they would be had they not attended law school, notwithstanding challenges facing recent graduates.

Lawsuits related to American legal education

In 2011, several law schools were sued for fraud and for misleading job placement statistics. Most of these suits have been dismissed on the merits.

In 1995, the United States Department of Justice Sued the American Bar Association, the accrediting body of American law schools, for allegedly violating the Sherman Antitrust Act. The settlement of the suit prohibited the ABA from using salary of faculty or administrators as an accreditation criterion.

Political balance

Liberal professors have claimed that there is conservative bias in law schools, particularly within law and economics and business law fields. Liberals have also argued for affirmative action to increase the representation of women and minorities among law students and law faculty.

Conservative students have argued that there is a liberal bias among top tier law faculty.

Law school rankings

There are several different law school rankings, each with a different emphasis and different methodology. Most either emphasize inputs or readily measurable outcomes (i.e., outcomes shortly after graduation); none measure value-added or long-term outcomes. In general, these rankings are controversial, not universally accepted as authoritative.

U.S. News & World Report's regularly publishes a list of the "Top 100 Law Schools" based on various qualitative and quantitative factors, e.g., entering student LSAT scores and GPAs, reputation surveys, expenditures per student, etc. U.S. News ratings heavily emphasize inputs—student test scores and grades, law school expenditures—but includes some outcomes such as bar passage and employment shortly after graduation. U.S. News rankings are heavily weighted toward "reputation", which is measured through a survey with small sample size and low response rates. The reputation scores are highly correlated with the previous years' reputation scores and may not reflect changes in law school quality over time.

The Social Science Research Network—a repository for draft and completed scholarship in law and the social sciences—publishes monthly rankings of law schools based on the number of times faculty members' scholarship was downloaded. Rankings are available by total number of downloads, total number of downloads within the last 12 months, and downloads per faculty member to adjust for the size of different institutions. SSRN also provides rankings of individual law school faculty members on these metrics.

Brian Leiter compiles a regular series of evaluations called "Brian Leiter's Law School Reports" in which he and other commentators discuss law schools. Leiter's rankings tend to emphasize the quality and quantity of faculty scholarship, as measured by citations in a select group of journals.

Several other ranking systems are explicitly designed to focus on employment outcomes at or shortly after graduation, including rankings by the National Law Journal, Vault.com and Above the Law. The National Law Journal provides a comparison of its employment-based rankings to U.S. News rankings. For students who are primarily interested in lucrative employment outcomes rather than scholarly prestige, this comparison may suggest which law schools are most undervalued by the market.

Top 14 law schools
There exists an informal category known as the "Top Fourteen" or "T14", which has historically referred to the fourteen institutions that regularly claim the top spots in the yearly U.S. News & World Report ranking of American law schools. Furthermore, the "T14" schools remain the only ones to have ever placed within the top ten spots in these rankings.  Although "T14" is not a designation used by U.S. News itself, the term is "widely known in the legal community." While these schools have seen their position within the top fourteen spots shift frequently, they have generally not placed outside of the top fourteen since the inception of the rankings. There have been rare exceptions: Texas and UCLA appeared in the 1987 list, before the start of the annual rankings (ahead of Northwestern and Cornell); Texas and UCLA displaced Georgetown in 2018 and 2022, respectively. Because of their relatively consistent placement at the top of these rankings, the schools that have taken the annual top spots since 1990 are commonly referred to as the "Top Fourteen" by published books on law school admissions, undergraduate university pre-law advisers, professional law school consultants, and newspaper articles on the subject. 

Those 14 schools, alphabetically, are: Berkeley, Chicago, Columbia, Cornell, Duke, Georgetown, Harvard, Michigan, New York University, Northwestern, Penn, Stanford, Virginia, and Yale.

It is unclear whether attending a higher ranked law school provides a larger boost to law school graduates' earnings than attending a lower ranked law school. Higher earnings and improved outcomes for graduates of higher ranked law schools may be due to these students' greater earnings potential compared to graduates of lower ranked law schools before they attended law school — higher standardized test scores and undergraduate GPAs, wealthier families and friends, etc. One study suggests that, after controlling for students incoming credentials, earnings and employment outcomes are better at lower ranked ABA approved law schools than at higher ranked law schools — that is, lower ranked law schools may do more to improve outcomes than higher ranked schools.

Regional tiers and lower-tier national schools
Most law schools outside the top tier are more regional in scope and often have very strong regional connections to these post-graduation opportunities. For example, a student graduating from a lower-tier law school may find opportunities in that school's "home market": the legal market containing many of that school's alumni, where most of the school's networking and career development energies are focused. In contrast, an upper-tier law school may find employment opportunities in a broader geographic region.

State-authorized schools
Many schools are authorized or accredited by a state and some have been in continuous operation for over 95 years. Most are located in Alabama, California, Massachusetts, Pennsylvania and Tennessee, and in Puerto Rico. Some state authorized law schools are maintained to offer a non-ABA option, experimenting with lower cost options.

Graduates of non-ABA approved law schools have much lower bar passage rates than same-race graduates of ABA-approved law schools in the same state.

Unaccredited schools
Some schools are not accredited by a state or the American Bar Association. Most are located in California. Such schools in California are registered and licensed to operate by The State Bar of California Committee of Bar Examiners (CBE), but are not accredited by the CBE. Their first year students are required to take the First-Year Law Students' Examination ("Baby Bar"), which then authorizes them to continue their studies in years following. Graduates of these schools may then take the California Bar Examination. Once they pass the Bar, they are licensed to practice law in California. However, many other jurisdictions do not allow graduates of unaccredited law schools to sit for their bar examination. In California, graduates of non-ABA approved law schools have much lower bar passage rates than same-race graduates of ABA-approved law schools in the same state.

Oldest active law schools
Law schools are listed by the dates from when they were first established.

 Marshall-Wythe School of Law (The College of William & Mary) established 1779 (closed in 1861 and reopened in 1920)
 University of Maryland Francis King Carey School of Law established 1816, held first classes in 1824 (closed during the American Civil War and reopened shortly after its end)
 Harvard Law School established 1817 (oldest continuously open school)
 University of Virginia School of Law established 1819
 Yale Law School established 1824
 University of Cincinnati College of Law established 1833
 Pennsylvania State University Dickinson School of Law established 1834
 New York University School of Law established 1835
 Indiana University Maurer School of Law established 1842
 Saint Louis University School of Law established in 1843 (closed in 1847 and reopened in 1908)
 University of North Carolina School of Law established 1845
 Louis D. Brandeis School of Law (University of Louisville) established 1846
 Cumberland School of Law established in 1847
 Tulane University Law School established 1847
 Washington and Lee University School of Law established 1849
 Baylor Law School established 1849 (closed in 1883 and reestablished 1920)
 University of Pennsylvania Law School established 1850
 Albany Law School established 1851
 University of Mississippi School of Law established 1854
 Columbia Law School established 1858

See also
 List of law schools in the United States
 List of law schools attended by United States Supreme Court justices
 IRAC
 Law School Admission Council
 Correspondence law school
 Catholic University of America School of Canon Law

References

Types of university or college
 
Law of the United States
Higher education in the United States